In Deep is an album by jazz musician Mark Lockheart, released in 2009 on Edition Records.

Reception 
In Deep received universally good reviews. In The Guardian John Fordham said "Lockheart picked the right title: that's exactly where it takes you" and awarded it 4 stars.  In All About Jazz, John Kelman wrote "The line-up may suggest mainstream, but this is no straight-ahead session...As impressive as Lockheart was on Moving Air, his playing has become even more muscular, combining the late Michael Brecker's visceral power with his own kind of tension-and-release." The Yorkshire Post wrote "Lockheart's work nods to Coltrane and Michael Brecker, but he's firmly his own man." Ray Comiskey in the Irish Times drew attention to Lockheart's skills in utilising the talents of his band "Lockheart’s voicings (using some brass overdubbing) have a fine appreciation of the tonal qualities the players bring to the table". Ian Mann said the album was a "strong candidate for Lockheart's best work to date". Lockheart was interviewed in Jazzwise in June 2009. He explained that the title of the album described how improvising is about connecting with another musician at a very deep level.

Track listing 
All compositions by Mark Lockheart except track 8 by Liam Noble and Mark Lockheart and track 10 by Liam Noble, Jasper Høiby, Dave Smith and Mark Lockheart
 Stairway – 1:50
 Surfacing – 10:05
 Golden People - 6:42
 Long Way Gone – 5:53
 Undercovers – 3:06
 Believe It Or Not – 7:49
 Not In My Name – 7:33
 Falling – 2:44
 Sand Into Gold – 5:58
 Snakeout – 1:14
 Nutter – 2:10
 Sunday soon – 5:34

Personnel 
Mark Lockheart - sax
Dave Priseman- trumpet
Liam Noble - piano 
Jasper Høiby - bass
Dave Smith - drums
Produced by Mark Lockheart
Recorded June 2008 at Phoenix Sound, Pinewood Studios, UK
Mixed January 2009 by Steve Baker at Galapagos Studios, London
Mastered February 2009 by Mark Tucker
Photography by Dave Stapleton and Tim Dickeson

References 

2009 albums
Edition Records albums